The Rhamu Incident, also known as Battle of Rhamu on the 29 June 1977, was a brief armed conflict between Kenya and Somalia, in which the latter invaded the Northern Frontier District on the eve of the Ogaden War. A force of 3000+  Somali soldiers supported by The Somali Air Force attacked a border post, and killed 480 Kenyan police officers and soldiers. The Somali army did not stay as the objective of their mission was to invade Ethiopian troops from a different side inside Ethiopia through Kenya, for an easy offensive rear attacks to backstab the Ethiopian army. Rhamu, situated on the Ethiopian-Kenyan border, lay on the road to the Sidamo region, and was considered a strategic point of entrance.The kenyan government after the huge casualties of  its forces in NFD, They immediately ordered a retreat from NFD, and started to mobilize all the Kenyan forces, near the border of NFD, The kenyan government worrisome of a bigger escalation from Somalia, They requested aid and interference from UK if things escalated to full war and incision into kenya, The Somali government denied the invasion, and claimed to have no knowledge of the incident.

References

1977 in Ethiopia
1977 in Somalia
1977 in Kenya
Cold War conflicts
Conflicts in 1977
Wars involving Somalia
Military history of Somalia
Kenya–Somalia border